"This Time" is a duet song performed by Detroit R&B duo Kiara and singer Shanice Wilson. It became a #2 hit on the R&B charts, only missing the top position to New Edition's "Can You Stand the Rain". A music video was filmed.

Track listing

12" single
A1. "This Time" (Extended Remix) (6:13)
B1. "This Time" (Single Remix) (4:26)
B2. "Strawberry Letter 23" (4:02)

Charts

References

Shanice songs
1988 singles
Song recordings produced by Nick Martinelli
Arista Records singles
1988 songs
Songs written by Charles Singleton (songwriter)